= Eastern Suburbs DRLFC =

Eastern Suburbs DRLFC may refer to:

- Eastern Suburbs District Rugby League Football Club, the former name of the Eastern Suburbs Tigers of Brisbane.
- Eastern Suburbs District Rugby League Football Club, the official name of the Sydney Roosters.
